"Partytime!" is a special promotional release by pop singer Gloria Estefan.

Released in 1998, "Partytime!" was sold only in Target Corporation department stores as a form of promotion for the Gloria! album. A complementary Spanish-language remix single, Bailando!, was released at the same time, again sold only at Target.

There is only one track on the release: "The Party Time Megamix", a 22-minute megamix of nine of Gloria's biggest hits up to that point, including a few with Miami Sound Machine. The megamix is an amalgamation of Megamix (1992) and Gloria's Hitmix (1998). Several of the included songs were remixed in a House or Techno style.

Megamix song sequence
 "Dr. Beat"
 "Conga"
 "I'm Not Giving You Up (Tony Moran Remix)"
 "You'll Be Mine (Party Time) (Rosabel's Fiesta Mix)"
 "Rhythm Is Gonna Get You"
 "1-2-3"
 "Get On Your Feet"
 "Everlasting Love (Classic Paradise Mix)"
 "Turn The Beat Around"

Production credits
Producer: Pablo Flores for Estefan Enterprises Inc.
Remix and additional production on "Turn The Beat Around" by Pablo Flores.
Keyboards and programming by Lester Mendez.
Mixed by Javier Garza.

1998 EPs
Gloria Estefan EPs
Epic Records EPs